Events from the year 1542 in France

Incumbents
 Monarch – Francis I

Events
 

 
 
 March 8 – Antoine Escalin des Eymars, the French ambassador, returns from Constantinople with promises of Ottoman aid in a war against Charles V, Holy Roman Emperor.

Births

Deaths

See also

References

1540s in France